Israel competed at the 1999 Summer Universiade also known as the XX Summer Universiade, in Palma de Mallorca, Spain.

Medals

Medals by sport

Sailing

Swimming

Men's

References

Summer Universiade
Israel
Israel at the Summer Universiade